El Pieloro (Spanish: Piedeloro) is one of 12 parishes (administrative divisions) in Carreño, a municipality within the province and autonomous community of Asturias, in northern Spain.

The postal code is 33439.

Villages and hamlets
 L'Alto la Ilesia
 Los Caleros
 El Cellero
 La Espeñada
 La Estación
 Llaneces
 El Llanu
 El Raitán
 El Rendaliego
 San Zabornín
 La Xunca

References 

Parishes in Carreño